Tops & Bottoms: Sex, Power and Sadomasochism is a Canadian documentary film, directed by Cristine Richey and released in 1999. The film depicts the BDSM subculture, most notably through the relationship of BDSM enthusuiast couple Robert and Mary Dante.

The film premiered in the Perspectives Canada at the 1999 Toronto International Film Festival, and was subsequently screened in the Midnight Madness lineup at the 1999 Cinefest Sudbury International Film Festival. It was broadcast by TVOntario as an episode of The View from Here in February 2000.

The film received a Genie Award nomination for Best Feature Length Documentary at the 20th Genie Awards in 2000.

References

External links
 

1999 films
1999 documentary films
Canadian documentary films
BDSM in films
1990s English-language films
1990s Canadian films